FDS may refer to:

Business
 Sarajevo Tobacco Factory, a Bosnian tobacco company
 FactSet, an American financial data company
 Federated Department Stores, now Macy's, an American retailer
 Ferrovie della Sardegna, an Italian railway company

Computing 
 Famicom Disk System (Family Computer Disk System), a video game console add-on
 Functional Design Specification, a type of requirements document
 Fire Dynamics Simulator, modelling software

Politics 
 Democratic Social Front, a political party in Guinea-Bissau
 Federation of the Left, a political coalition in Italy
 Force of the South, a defunct political party in Italy
 Salvadoran Democratic Front, a political organization active during the Salvadoran Civil War
 Sankarist Democratic Front, a political party in Burkina Faso

Other
 Formerly Used Defense Sites, properties that were under the jurisdiction of the United States Secretary of Defense
 FDS Intimate + Body, a feminine deodorant spray
 r/FemaleDatingStrategy, a Reddit community

See also

 
 
 
 
 FD (disambiguation)